The Serbian First League, referred to as the Mozzart Bet First League for sponsorship reasons, is the name for the second tier in professional Serbia's football league. The league was formed in 2005, following a reshuffle of the second tier Serbo-Montenegrin divisions. It is operated by the Football Association of Serbia.

Format
The league is usually formed by 16 clubs which play all against one another twice, once at home, once away. Due to the COVID-19 pandemic in 2020, the Football Association of Serbia completed a restructure of the league system, and in season 2020/2021 that meant 18 clubs would be competing in the Serbian First League, the number of clubs will go back to the usual 16 following the conclusion of the 2020-2021 season. The top two clubs are directly promoted to the Serbian SuperLiga, Third team going into the playoff, and playing against 14 teams from the Super League, while the bottom are relegated to the Serbian League. The Football Association of Serbia announced that in the 2015–16 Serbian First League 4 clubs will be relegated.

History

The Serbian First League is the successor of the Yugoslav Second League. With the break-up of SFR Yugoslavia in 1992, the clubs from the newly independent states of Bosnia and Herzegovina, Croatia, Macedonia and Slovenia joined to their own newly formed leagues, while Serbia and Montenegro remained united and renamed into FR Yugoslavia with the clubs from both republics kept competing in the league. In 2003, the Federal Republic of Yugoslavia was renamed to Serbia and Montenegro and the football league followed suit. Finally, after Montenegrin independence in 2006, the Montenegrin clubs withdrew and formed their own league.

Serbia and Montenegro second tier
In 2005, a reshuffle of the second tier of the Serbo-Montenegrin football league system saw two parallel leagues set up, for each republic.

Serbian First League
After Montenegro's independence, the Serbian First League kept the name and single league format readopted in 2005.

2022–23 teams

Previous seasons

Relegated teams (from First League to Serbian League)

Relegated teams (from SuperLiga to First League)

Promoted teams (from Serbian League to First League)

All-time table 2005–2022

The following is a list of clubs who have played in the Serbian First League at any time since its formation in 2005 to the current season. Teams playing in the 2022–23 Serbian First League season are indicated in bold. A total of 73 teams have played in the Serbian First League.

Players

Top scorers

Most apps

Names of the competition
 2022–2025: Mozzart Bet First League

See also
 Serbian SuperLiga
 Serbian League
 Zone Leagues

References

External links
 Official website 
 Serbian First League at Football Association of Serbia 

 
2
Second level football leagues in Europe
Professional sports leagues in Serbia